The Lawrence Ministry was the 31st Ministry of the Government of Western Australia, and was led by Labor Premier Dr Carmen Lawrence and her deputy Ian Taylor. It succeeded the Dowding Ministry on 18 February 1990, following the resignation of Peter Dowding six days earlier following an open letter signed by a majority of the 47-member Labor caucus. The ministry was in turn succeeded by the Court–Cowan Ministry on 16 February 1993 after the Labor Party lost government at the state election held on 6 February.

Overview
Of the former Dowding ministry, 15 of the 17 ministers retained office—Peter Dowding and Julian Grill were not reappointed, and backbenchers Pam Buchanan (Ashburton) and Dr Geoff Gallop (Victoria Park) took their place. Two months later, former Deputy Premier David Parker resigned from both the Ministry and from Parliament.

At a caucus meeting held on 29 January 1991, a spill motion was carried which created three vacancies in the Ministry. On 5 February, Jeff Carr, Gavan Troy and Pam Buchanan were removed as Ministers, whilst Eric Ripper, Dr Judyth Watson and Jim McGinty were sworn in. A major crisis was precipitated when Carr resigned from Parliament, with his seat of Geraldton being won by a Liberal at a by-election, whilst Troy ceased to attend caucus meetings and Buchanan resigned from the party, sitting as an Independent. With the resignation of left-wing MLA Dr Ian Alexander a month later, the Government was forced to depend on independents in the Legislative Assembly to maintain supply—the first time Western Australia had had minority government since 1905.

First Ministry
On 16 February 1990, the Lieutenant-Governor and Administrator, Sir Francis Burt, constituted the Ministry. He designated 17 principal executive offices of the Government and appointed the following ministers to their positions, and served until the reconstitution of the Ministry on 5 February 1991. The list below is ordered by decreasing seniority within the Cabinet, as indicated by the Government Gazette and the Hansard index.

The members of the Ministry were:

 On 5 April 1990, former Deputy Premier and Treasurer David Parker announced his imminent resignation from the Ministry and from Parliament. His former responsibilities were shared across three other ministers.

Second Ministry
On 5 February 1991, the Governor, Sir Francis Burt, reconstituted the Ministry. He designated 16 principal executive offices of the Government and appointed the ministers to their positions. The appointed members remained Ministers until the end of the Lawrence Ministry on 16 February 1993.

 On 20 October 1992, the six-volume Part One of the WA Inc Royal Commission was tabled in Parliament. A confidential appendix to the Director of Public Prosecutions concerned matters which may lead to prosecution. The following day, the Premier announced that Environment Minister Bob Pearce would stand down from the Ministry and vacate his seat at the next election. The ministry reduced to 15 members, with Jim McGinty assuming the Environment portfolio.
 On 13 November 1992, Keith Wilson, the Minister for Health, resigned from the Ministry over a range of objections to the Government. Factional disputes over who should replace him resulted in a non-factional MLC, Tom Stephens, being selected ahead of the factions' preferred candidates, Nick Catania and Judy Edwards.

References
 Hansard Indexes for 1990–1992, "Legislature of Western Australia"
 
 
 
 
 
 
 

Western Australian ministries
Australian Labor Party ministries in Western Australia
Ministries of Elizabeth II